The 2016 Trofeo Alfredo Binda-Comune di Cittiglio was the 41th running of the women's Trofeo Alfredo Binda-Comune di Cittiglio, a women's bicycle race in Italy. It was the third race of the 2016 UCI Women's World Tour season and was held on 20 March 2016 starting in Gavirate and finishing in Cittiglio. The race was won by the British cyclist Lizzie Armitstead for the second year in a row.

Results

See also
2016 in women's road cycling

References

Trofeo Alfredo Binda
Trofeo Alfredo Binda-Comune di Cittiglio
Trofeo Alfredo Binda